Charlestown railway station may refer to:

Charlestown railway station (ER), on the Elgin Railway in Scotland
Charlestown railway station (Ireland), in County Mayo, Ireland
Charlestown (KL) railway station, on the Kincardine Line in Scotland

See also
Charlestown (disambiguation)
Charleston station (disambiguation)